"La Maritza" is a song by Sylvie Vartan from her 1968 album Sylvie Vartan (also known as La Maritza). It was also released as an EP and as a single.

Background and writing 
The song was written by Jean Renard and Pierre Delanoë.

Sylvie Vartan, who was born in Bulgaria, sings her nostalgia for her homeland, especially the Maritsa River.

Commercial performance 
In France the song was released on an EP (La Maritza / Un p'tit peu beaucoup / Jolie poupée).

In Wallonia (French Belgium) the EP charted as a double A-side "La Maritza / Un p'tit peu beaucoup". It spent 19 weeks in the singles chart, peaking at no. 4.

The song "La Maritza" also reached at least in the top 4 in Finland in 1970 (according to the chart, courtesy of INTRO, published by U.S. Billboard magazine in its "Hits of the World" section).

Track listings 
7-inch EP "La Maritza / Un p'tit peu beaucoup / Jolie poupée" (RCA Victor 87.074 M in France, RCA Victor TP-455 in Portugal)
A. "La Maritza" (3:42)
B1. "Un p'tit peu beaucoup" (2:30)
B2. "Jolie poupée"

7-inch single "La Maritza / Un p'tit peu beaucoup" RCA Victor 3 10372 (Spain)
A. "La Maritza" (3:42)
B. "Un p'tit peu beaucoup" (2:30)

Charts 
 "La Maritza" / "Un p'tit peu beaucoup"

Cover versions 
Sylvie Vartan herself recorded the song also in Italian (under the title "La Maritza") and in German (under the title "Lied ohne Wiederkehr").

Also the song has been covered, among others, by Seija Simola (in Finnish under the title "Maritza"), Bart Kaëll (in Dutch under the title "Maritza"), Elisa Tovati and Nawel Ben Kraïem, Jitka Molavcová and Hana Hegerová (in Czech under the title "Co mi dáš").

In 2012, the song was covered by symphonic metal band Therion on their cover album Les Fleurs du Mal (Therion album). The song has been streamed over 1,7 million times at Spotify and is one of the most popular Therion songs at this platform.

In 2014, this song has also been covered by Scarecrow, a Finnish horror punk band. It was released on their 2014 7-inch EP "Amores de Vampiros".

Seija Simola's version reached at least the top 6 in Finland in 1970 (according to the chart, courtesy of INTRO, published in the "Hits of the World" section of the 21 January 1978 issue of U.S. Billboard).

References

External links 
 Sylvie Vartan — La Maritza / Un p'tit peu beaucoup / Jolie poupée (EP) at Discogs

1968 songs
1968 singles
French songs
Sylvie Vartan songs
RCA Victor singles
Songs written by Pierre Delanoë
Songs written by Jean Renard (songwriter)